The Vogt House, also known as the Vogt-Unash House, is a historic building located in Iowa City, Iowa, United States.  The two-story, brick structure is a fine example of vernacular Queen Anne architecture.  It follows an asymmetrical plan and features a high-pitched hipped roof, a gabled and a round dormer on the south elevation, a two-story gabled-roof pavilion on the east, a two-story polygonal bay with a hipped roof on the west, and a single-story addition on the back.  Of particular merit is the wrap-around, latticework porch that has a round pavilion with a conical roof and finial on its southwest corner.  There are also two outbuildings: a two-story frame carriage house to the west of the house, and a woodshed to the north of the main house.

The house was individually listed on the National Register of Historic Places in 1978.  In 1994 it was included as a contributing property in the Brown Street Historic District.

References

Houses completed in 1890
Queen Anne architecture in Iowa
Houses in Iowa City, Iowa
National Register of Historic Places in Iowa City, Iowa
Houses on the National Register of Historic Places in Iowa
Individually listed contributing properties to historic districts on the National Register in Iowa